Norway has forty-five indoor ice hockey rinks and four indoor speed skating rinks. The speed skating rinks are Vikingskipet, Fosenhallen, Sørmarka Arena and Arena Nordvest.

Current rinks

Future rinks

Former rinks

Notes

References

Norway
Ice rinks
Figure skating in Norway
Ice skating-related lists